The Tarva islands are an archipelago in the municipality of Ørland in Trøndelag county, Norway. The largest and only populated island is Husøya and the other larger islands are Været and Karlsøya. There are also many smaller surrounding islets and skerries. Tarva is connected to the mainland via the Dybfest–Tarva Ferry.

The islands were owned by the Austrått manor until 1858. The Royal Norwegian Air Force has a firing range on the western islands. The small Tarva Chapel is located on the northern side of the main island.

See also
List of islands of Norway

References

Landforms of Trøndelag
Archipelagoes of Norway
Archipelagoes of the Norwegian Sea
Ørland